Joseph James Reekie (born February 22, 1965) is a Canadian former ice hockey player. Reekie was born in Victoria, British Columbia.

A stay-at-home defenceman renowned for his defensive skills, Reekie was originally drafted in 1983 by the Hartford Whalers; however, he never signed with the team and re-entered the NHL draft two years later where he was drafted this time by the Buffalo Sabres.  Reekie played for the Sabres, New York Islanders, Tampa Bay Lightning, Washington Capitals, and Chicago Blackhawks.

After retiring from active professional play, Reekie became a post-game analyst for the Capitals on Comcast SportsNet.  He has three children, Jamie, Jordan, and Justin Reekie.

Career statistics

Regular season and playoffs

External links

Profile at hockeydraftcentral.com

1965 births
Living people
Buffalo Sabres draft picks
Buffalo Sabres players
Canadian ice hockey defencemen
Capital District Islanders players
Chicago Blackhawks players
Cornwall Royals (OHL) players
Hartford Whalers draft picks
Ice hockey people from British Columbia
National Hockey League broadcasters
Nepean Raiders players
New York Islanders players
North Bay Centennials players
Rochester Americans players
Sportspeople from Victoria, British Columbia
Springfield Indians players
Tampa Bay Lightning players
Washington Capitals players